Whiz Kids was a name given to a group of experts from RAND Corporation with which Robert McNamara surrounded himself in order to turn around the management of the United States Department of Defense (DoD) in the 1960s. The purpose was to shape a modern defense strategy in the Nuclear Age by bringing in economic analysis, operations research, game theory, computing, as well as implementing modern management systems to coordinate the huge dimension of operations of the DoD with methods such as the Planning, Programming, and Budgeting System (PPBS). They were called the Whiz Kids recalling the group at Ford Motor Company that McNamara was part of a decade earlier. The group included (among others):
 Harold Brown
 Alain Enthoven
 Steven Fenster
 Patrick Gross
 William Kaufmann
 Jan Lodal
 Howard Margolis
 Frank Nicolai
 Merton Joseph Peck
 Charles O. Rossotti
 Henry Rowen
 John H. Rubel
 Willis H. Sargent
 Ivan Selin
 Pierre Sprey
 David Staiger
 Adam Yarmolinsky
 Richard Zeckhauser
 Thomas Nicholson

References

Further reading
 Kaplan, Fred. The Wizards of Armageddon. New York: Simon and Schuster, 1983.

 Cold War history of the United States
 United States Department of Defense
RAND Corporation